The 2023 Bracknell Forest Borough Council election will take place on 4 May 2023, to elect all 41 members in 15 wards for Bracknell Forest Borough Council in England. The election will take place on the same day as other local elections in England as part of the 2023 United Kingdom local elections.  Due to a boundary review there has been a change in ward boundaries, along with a reduction in size from 42 members elected in 2019.  This will be the first election since 1971 (under the council's predecessor Easthampstead Rural District) where a majority of seats are outside Bracknell.

The election will be held alongside concurrent town & parish council elections in Binfield, Bracknell, Crowthorne, Sandhurst, Warfield, and Winkfield.

Background

The council has been controlled by the Conservative Party since the unitary authority was created in 1997. The predecessor district council was controlled by the Conservatives, save for an initial period from 1973 to 1976 and later 1995 to 1997 when it was controlled by the Labour Party.  

Paul Bettison has been Leader of the Council since 1997, having been elected leader of the Conservative group in 1996.  Mary Temperton has been leader of the Labour group since 2011.  Thomas Parker, the lone Liberal Democrat, has announced he will not stand for re-election, having been first elected in 2019.

Candidates

Binfield North & Warfield West

Binfield South & Jennett’s Park

Bullbrook

Crowthorne

Easthampstead & Wildridings

Great Hollands

Hanworth

Harmans Water & Crown Wood

Owlsmoor & College Town

Priestwood & Garth

Sandhurst

Swinley Forest

Town Centre & The Parks

Whitegrove

Winkfield & Warfield East

Councillors standing down

References

2023 English local elections
2019
2020s in Berkshire
May 2023 events in the United Kingdom